Kunek (also Romanized as Kūnek; also known as Kahnak, Kohnak, and Kohnek) is a village in Gafr and Parmon Rural District, Gafr and Parmon District, Bashagard County, Hormozgan Province, Iran. At the 2006 census, its population was 693, in 153 families.

References 

Populated places in Bashagard County